Spraytown is an unincorporated community in Pershing Township, Jackson County, Indiana, United States.

History
Spraytown was named for a local merchant named Spray. The post office at Spraytown closed in 1909.

Geography

References

Unincorporated communities in Jackson County, Indiana
Unincorporated communities in Indiana